Thomas Ward (2 December 1874 – c. 1942) was a rugby union player who represented Australia.

Ward, a wing, was born in Brisbane, Queensland and claimed 1 international rugby cap for Australia. His debut game was against Great Britain, at Brisbane, on 22 July 1899.

References

Australian rugby union players
Australia international rugby union players
1874 births
1942 deaths
Rugby union players from Brisbane
Rugby union wings